Iron Eagle may refer to:

Iron Eagle, a 1986 motion picture
Iron Eagle II, 1988 sequel
Aces: Iron Eagle III, 1992 sequel
Iron Eagle on the Attack a.k.a. Iron Eagle IV, 1995 sequel
Iron Eagle (soundtrack), the soundtrack of the 1986 movie 
Iron Eagle (military slang)
The Reichsadler ("Imperial Eagle"), a symbol used in Germany